Caldwell High School may refer to:

In the United States:
Caldwell High School (Caldwell, Idaho), Caldwell, Idaho
Caldwell High School (Caldwell, Kansas), Caldwell, Kansas
Caldwell County High School, Princeton, Kentucky
James Caldwell High School, West Caldwell, New Jersey
Caldwell County Gateway School, Granite Falls, North Carolina
Caldwell County Career Center, Hudson, North Carolina
South Caldwell High School, Hudson, North Carolina
West Caldwell High School, Lenoir, North Carolina
Caldwell High School (Caldwell, Ohio), Caldwell, Ohio
Caldwell High School (Caldwell, Texas), Caldwell, Texas